Don't Get Done, Get Dom is a British consumer rights television series. The show is named for its presenter Dominic Littlewood. Each series is transmitted, usually daily during daytime, on BBC One and repeated on BBC Two in the UK. During Series 7 it is co-presented by Rani Price.

Series nine premiered on 4 May 2015 and ended on 29 May 2015, lasting a total of 4 weeks and 20 episodes.

In September 2015, it was announced series nine would be the last.

Format 
The show also helps people who have been treated unfairly to get deals or refunds on products or services. Examples from the series are people who have had their wedding holiday spoilt by the company they booked with, and someone being overcharged by their mobile phone provider. Littlewood explores the gaps in regulation that allowed this injustice to happen.

Littlewood also deals with complaints to companies for matters such as excessive utility bills. In many cases customers receive a refund or prices are reduced to correct values.

There is a segment on the show dealing with what people know about their consumer rights and giving out tips on how to get best value for money.

During previous versions of the show, a member of the public was"tutored" into getting a better deal on a product which they are attempting to buy; typically giving them more confidence in talking to and making deals with the store assistants and managers. Examples from the series are people purchasing video cameras and sports gear.

This is achieved by Littlewood seeing camera footage of a first attempt, and giving them pointers. After this they try another shop but this time Littlewood can communicate to the member of the public by means of a hidden earpiece.

There was also previously a section where Littlewood attempts to save a shopper he meets in the street money by haggling the deal himself.

Transmissions

Original Series

See also
Fake Britain
Rip Off Britain
Watchdog

References

External links
 
 
 Don't Get Done Be On The Show – Flame TV

2006 British television series debuts
2015 British television series endings
2000s British reality television series
2010s British reality television series
BBC high definition shows
BBC Television shows
Business-related television series in the United Kingdom
Consumer protection television series
Consumer protection in the United Kingdom
English-language television shows